Bizay Sonkar Shastri (born 24 September 1959) is an Indian politician from Bharatiya Janata Party.

Personal life 

Born to Shivlal Sonkar and Munni Devi on 24 September 1959 in Varanasi, Uttar Pradesh, Bizay had four brothers and four sisters; his elder brother Shri Rajnath Sonkar is a Member of Parliament. He is married to Dr. Suman Sonkar Shastri and has two sons.

Shastri ji spent his early years of life in Varanasi, Uttar Pradesh, where he completed his primary education from Central Hindu Boys School and intermediate from National Inter College. After this, he completed his Masters from the Banaras Hindu University.

Political career 

He was elected to Lok Sabha from Saidpur in 1998 elections and was subsequently chosen as the Chairman of ST/SC Commission (Government of India).  In 2004, he was appointed the Vice-chairman of National SC/ST front (BJP) and was elected as the National Executive Member of Bharatiya Janata Party in 2008.

References

India MPs 1998–1999
Politicians from Varanasi
1959 births
Living people
Lok Sabha members from Uttar Pradesh
Bharatiya Janata Party politicians from Uttar Pradesh
Vishva Hindu Parishad members
Banaras Hindu University alumni
Sampurnanand Sanskrit Vishwavidyalaya alumni
Place of birth missing (living people)
People from Ghazipur district